Julien Stéphan (born 18 September 1980) is a French professional football manager and former player who was most recently the manager of Ligue 1 club Strasbourg. As a player, he was as a defensive midfielder. From December 2018 to March 2021, Stéphan managed his hometown club Rennes, winning the 2018–19 Coupe de France, before managing Strasbourg from July 2021 to January 2023.

Early life
Stéphan was born in Rennes, Ille-et-Vilaine, France.

Managerial career
On 3 December 2018, Sabri Lamouchi was sacked as manager of Ligue 1 club Rennes due to poor results. While initially given a role as interim manager, Stéphan was given the permanent role nine days later after a string of victories including against Astana in the UEFA Europa League, qualifying Rennes for their first ever European knockout round. After dispatching Real Betis, the club lost 4–3 on aggregate to Arsenal in the last 16.

Stéphan led Rennes to their first trophy in 48 years on 27 April 2019 in the Coupe de France, beating Paris Saint-Germain 6–5 in a penalty shoot-out in the final after drawing 2–2. He faced the same opponents on 3 August in the 2019 Trophée des Champions, a 2–1 loss. In the 2019–20 season, Stéphan's Rennes team finished in third place when the season was curtailed by the COVID-19 pandemic, therefore qualifying for the first time to the UEFA Champions League. He resigned on 1 March 2021, after four straight defeats and seven games without a win.

In July 2021, Stéphan was appointed as manager of Ligue 1 club Strasbourg. In his first season, he led the club to a sixth-place finish in the top flight, a first since the 1979–80 season. In January 2023, with Strasbourg sitting in nineteenth place with one win from seventeen games, Stéphan was sacked.

Personal life
Stéphan is the son of France national team assistant manager Guy Stéphan and the brother of Guillaume Stéphan, also a former footballer.

Managerial statistics

Honours

Manager 
Rennes B

 Championnat de France Amateur: 2016–17
 Championnat de France Amateur 2: 2015–16

Rennes
Coupe de France: 2018–19

References

External links

1980 births
Living people
Footballers from Rennes
French footballers
Rennes 2 University alumni
Association football midfielders
Paris Saint-Germain F.C. players
Toulouse FC players
Racing Club de France Football players
Stade Briochin players
FC Drouais players
French football managers
Association football coaches
FC Drouais non-playing staff
LB Châteauroux non-playing staff
FC Lorient non-playing staff
Stade Rennais F.C. non-playing staff
Stade Rennais F.C. managers
RC Strasbourg Alsace managers
Championnat National 3 managers
Championnat National 2 managers
Ligue 1 managers